Hakobyan is an Armenian surname with the meaning "son of Hakob" (Armenian for Jacob). This surname has multitudes of transliterations into Latin alphabet, including Acopian, Acopyan, Agopian, Agopyan, Akobian, Akobyan, Akopyan, Hagopian, Hagopyan, Hakobian, and others. Similar Russified surname: Akopov. Variants: Hakobyants, Hagopiantz (with similar variations of rendering in Latin alphabet).

The surname may refer to:

A

Acopian 
Sarkis Acopian (1926–2007), Armenian-American inventor, industrialist, environmentalist

Agopian 
Krikor Agopian, Lebanese-Canadian painter
Ştefan Agopian, Romanian writer

Agopyan 
Simon Agopyan (1857-1921), Ottoman Armenian landscape and portrait painter
Vahan Agopyan, Turkish-born Armenian-Brazilian engineer and rector of the University of São Paulo

Akobian 
Varuzhan Akobian, Armenian-American chess Grandmaster

Akopian 
Alex Akopian, Armenian entrepreneur
Arthur Akopian, Soviet Armenian gymnast and coach (also Artur Akopian, Arthur Akopyan, Arthur Akopian 
Nelly Akopian-Tamarina, Russian pianist of Armenian descent
Vladimir Akopian, Armenian chess Grandmaster

Akopyan 
Amayak Akopyan (born 1956), Soviet and Russian Armenian illusionist, actor, circus artist
Arkadi Akopyan, Russian Armenian football player
Armen Akopyan, Ukrainian Armenian football player
Karen Akopyan, Russian Armenian football player
Olena Akopyan (born 1969), Ukrainian Armenian Paralympic swimmer
Olga Akopyan (born 1985), Russian handball player
Setrak Akopyan (born 1999), Russian Armenian football player 
Stepan Yegorovich Akopyan, Prime Minister of Armenian Soviet Socialist Republic (1937)

Akopyants 
Andrey Akopyants, Uzbekistani football player of Armenian descent

H

Hagopian 
Anne Hagopian van Buren (1927–2008), American art historian
Clara Hagopian, maiden name of the (adopting) mother of Steve Jobs
Dean Hagopian, Armenian-Canadian actor, radio personality and musician, voice actor and record producer
Frances Hagopian, political scientist.
Hagop Der Hagopian (1884–1983), birth name of Shahan Natalie (1884–1983), an Armenian activist and principal organizer of Operation Nemesis, a campaign of revenge against officials of the former Ottoman Empire who instigated the Armenian Genocide during World War I. He is also a writer and a thinker
Hagop Hagopian (militant), nom de guerre of Harutiun Takoshian, an Armenian military commander and guerilla, leader of the Armenian Secret Army for the Liberation of Armenia (ASALA)
Harold Hagopian, Armenian-American violinist, entrepreneur, record producer and founder of Traditional Crossroads world music record label
J. Michael Hagopian (1913–2010), Armenian-born American filmmaker
Richard Hagopian (born 1937), Armenian-American oud player and a traditional Armenian musician
Robert Hagopian (1911-1995), Armenian-American attorney, government official, and politician
Seta Hagopian, or Seta Agobian, Iraqi Armenian singer
V. H. Hagopian (died 1916), Ottoman Armenian author and professor of Ottoman Turkish and Persian in Anatolia College
Yenovk Der Hagopian (1900–1966), American-Armenian artist, sculptor and musician

Hakobian 
Hakob Hakobian (painter) or Hakob Hakobyan, also spelled Hagop Hagopian (1923–2013), modern Armenian painter
Hakob Hakobian (poet) often transliterated from Russian as Akop Akopian (1866–1937), Soviet Armenian poet, the founder of Armenian proletarian poetry
Hakob Melik Hakobian (1835–1888), Armenian author, novelist and leading figure in 19th-century Armenian literature, better known by his pen name Raffi (Armenian: Րաֆֆի; Persian: رافی)

Hakopian 
Michael Andrew Hakopian Armenian-American drummer of the Deli Creeps, Giant Robot II, and the Cornbugs a.k.a. Pinchface
Raffi Hakopian, Armenian-American violinist

Hakobyan 
Andranik Hakobyan (born 1981), Armenian-Swiss boxer
Andranik Hakobyan (poet) (born 1959), Armenian poet, publicist, statesman and public figure
Anna Hakobyan (born 1978), Armenian journalist, wife of the Prime Minister of Armenia, Nikol Pashinyan
Ara Hakobyan (born 1980), Armenian football player
Ara H. Hakobyan (born 1973), Armenian artist, art critic
Aram Hakobyan (born 1979), Armenian football player
Davit Hakobyan (born 1993), Armenian football player
Felix Hakobyan (born 1981), Armenian football player
Gor Hakobyan (born 1988), Armenian rapper, broadcaster and actor
Taguhi Hakobyan Soviet Armenian actress known as Hasmik,
Hayk Hakobyan (born 1980), Armenian football player
Hayk Hakobyan (singer) (born 1973), Armenian singer better known as Hayko
Hayk Hakobyan (weightlifter), Armenian weightlifter
Hranush Hakobyan, Armenian politician, member of the National Assembly of Armenia and Minister of the Diaspora
Joseph Hakobyan (born 1931), Russian Armenian scientist
Karen Hakobyan, American-Armenian pianist, composer and conductor
Kristine Hakobyan (born 1988), Armenian football player
Leonid Hakobyan (1936-2002), Soviet Armenian economist
Mariam Hakobyan (born 1949), Armenian sculptor
Mihran Hakobyan (born 1984), Armenian sculptor
Movses Hakobyan (born 1965), Armenian military official and the former commander of Artsakh (Nagorno-Karabakh) Defense Army 
Silva Hakobyan (born 1988), Armenian pop singer
Tatul Hakobyan (born 1969), Armenian reporter and political analyst
Vagharshak Hakobyan (born 1991), Armenian Turkologist and politician, Member of the National Assembly of Armenia
Vahe Hakobyan (politician, born 1971), Armenian politician
Vahe Hakobyan (politician, born 1977), Armenian politician
Vahtang Hakobyan (born 1975), Armenian football player
Versand Hakobyan (1950–2022), Armenian oligarch and politician

Armenian-language surnames
Patronymic surnames
Surnames from given names